A nitisol in the World Reference Base for Soil Resources (WRB) is a deep, red, well-drained soil with a clay content of more than 30% and a blocky structure. Nitisols correlate with the kandic alfisols, ultisols and inceptisols of the USDA soil taxonomy.

These soils are found in the tropics and subtropics; there are extensive areas of them in the tropical highlands of Ethiopia, Kenya, Democratic Republic of the Congo and Cameroon. Nitisols form from fine-textured material weathered from intermediate to basic parent rock and kaolinite, halloysite and iron oxides dominate their clay mineralogy.

The natural vegetation on nitisols includes tropical rain forest and savannah. Limitations frequently include low phosphorus availability and low base status, but once ameliorated, these deep, stable soils have high agricultural potential, and are often planted to crops.

See also 
Pedogenesis
Pedology
Soil classification

References
 IUSS Working Group WRB: World Reference Base for Soil Resources, fourth edition. International Union of Soil Sciences, Vienna 2022. .

Further reading
 W. Zech, P. Schad, G. Hintermaier-Erhard: Soils of the World. Springer, Berlin 2022, Chapter 9.3.2.

External links 
 profile photos (with classification) WRB homepage
 profile photos (with classification) IUSS World of Soils

Pedology
Types of soil